Mount Borgeson is a peak  east-southeast of Smith Peak in the Walker Mountains of Thurston Island. It was first delineated from air photos taken by U.S. Navy Operation Highjump, 1946–47, and named by the Advisory Committee on Antarctic Names for Warren T. Borgeson, a topographic engineer with the U.S. Navy Bellingshausen Sea Expedition, who established geodetic control points in this area in February 1960.

See also
 Mountains in Antarctica

Maps
 Thurston Island – Jones Mountains. 1:500000 Antarctica Sketch Map. US Geological Survey, 1967.
 Antarctic Digital Database (ADD). Scale 1:250000 topographic map of Antarctica. Scientific Committee on Antarctic Research (SCAR). Since 1993, regularly upgraded and updated.

References 

Mountains of Ellsworth Land